O'Meara's Acres is a townland in the Barony of Ormond Lower, County Tipperary, Ireland. It is located in the Civil parish of Kilbarron.

Lesseragh House, a four bay, two storey residence with three chimneys, parapet eaves and a porch to the front is listed as a protected structure by Tipperary County Council (RPS Ref S309)

References

Townlands of County Tipperary